Lord Black may refer to the following:
 William Black, Baron Black (1893–1984), British automotive executive
 Conrad Black, Baron Black of Crossharbour (born 1944), Canadian-born British former newspaper publisher
 Guy Black, Baron Black of Brentwood (born 1964), Deputy Chairman of the Telegraph Media Group